Lichfield is a rural settlement in the South Waikato District and Waikato region of New Zealand's North Island.

The community is centred around the Lichfield Fonterra facility, opened in 1995. The factory features the largest cheese factory in the southern hemisphere,  consisting of separate dry salt and brine salt plants. It also features the largest milk dryer in the world, installed during a major expansion in 2016. The dryer can process 30 metric tonnes of milk every hour, and store 40,000 metric tonnes of whole milk powder. The dryer is used during the peak season, with production varying based on prices. The Fonterra site employs 330 people, with extra staff being stationed there during installations. Almost 90% of the output travels by rail from a covered siding at the factory.

The local Lichfields Lands farm converted from sheep to dairy and beef farming in the 1960s. It is now an Open Brethren operation, donating its proceeds to charity.

South African-born artist Sonnett Olls opened an art gallery in Lichfield in 2019.

A Red Cross health shuttle transports Lichfield residents to health appointments in Tīrau.

History 
In 1882, at a time when the Rotorua railway was planned to pass through Lichfield, they formed a company in London to encourage settlers and construction of the  railway link from Morrinsville began the same year. The attempt failed. Another was made to sell lots for a town in 1905.

Railway station 
Lichfield railway station opened in 1886, closed on 1 March 1897, was reopened by Taupo Totara Timber Company in September 1905, closed on 26 October 1944, reopened on 12 June 1950 and closed on 6 August 1978, but the Kinleith Branch continues to carry freight.

Work on the extension from Oxford (Tīrau) to Lichfield started in 1883. The Thames Valley and Rotorua Railway directors inspected the route and stayed at Lichfield in October 1883.  The line reached Oxford (Tīrau) on 8 March 1886 and was extended to Lichfield on Monday 21 June 1886. New Zealand Railways Department (NZR) took over the line on 1 April 1886.

From 1886 to 1892 there was a Post Office at the station. By 1892 traffic to and from Lichfield had fallen off rapidly, with opening of part of the Rotorua line. From 17 September 1892 Lichfield was demoted to a flag station, though it still had a 4th class station, platform, cart approach, goods shed, cattle yards and urinals in 1896. The branch was lifted in 1898.

The Putāruru – Lichfield trackbed was leased to Taupo Totara Timber Co for their tramway from 1904. As well as timber, the tramway also carried some passengers. After their mill burnt down in 1944, much of the line was dismantled, though some use was still being made of the tramway in 1945.

The government bought the tramway in 1946. By 1949 Lichfield was again a terminus of the line, with a shelter shed (16ft x 10ft),  a (20ft x 16ft) prefabricated army building from Claudelands, used as temporary office accommodation, and a passing loop for 64 wagons.

There was again speculation that Lichfield would grow and, from Monday 12 June 1950, the station reopened for parcels and goods. The offices were then moved to Tokoroa.

In 1959 the gent's convenience was in a bad state of repair and was removed. By 1960 the goods shed floor and weatherboards were decayed, the windows broken and the doors lying on the floor, so it was demolished. By 1970 the station was little used and it closed to all traffic from Sunday 6 August 1978. It was then used for the storage of wagons. A single track, loading bank, water tower and sheds remain.

Listed buildings 
There are 4 buildings with NZHPT Category II listing  -

 Listed on 5 September 1985 were -
The water also supplied the township. The pipes have been removed, but a stone shed for the intake valves remains.
 4236 former Skimming Factory at 831 Lichfield Road was built of totara in 1910 for the NZ Dairy Association. It ran for three seasons until home separation was adopted. It was converted to a house in 1923.
 4237 - former Bakehouse and dairy at 12 Kinloch Rd, built of Hinuera stone in the 1880s. It is now derelict.
 2689 listed on 30 June 2006 - former Stone Store, probably built before 1886, was a shop in the grounds of the Lichfield Hotel. Poets Rex Fairburn and Ronald Mason lived there in 1927-28. It was built of Putāruru ignimbrite and was also used as a bank, a church and now a club room. It is at 6 Pepperill Road.

Education

References

South Waikato District
Populated places in Waikato